Désertines is a commune in the Mayenne department in north-western France.

Sights
 Saint-Pierre Church (19th century).
 Gallic stele, listed as historical monuments since 1924.
 Manor, also known as the Château de la Grande Haie.
 The Manor of the Vairie.

See also
Communes of the Mayenne department

References

Communes of Mayenne